Juan Bautista Pérez (20 December 1869 – 7 May 1952), was a Venezuelan lawyer, magistrate, and politician who served as the president of Venezuela between 1929 until 1931. Afterwards he served as Ambassador to Spain until 1933. His period in office saw several attempts to overthrow Juan Vicente Gómez (who remained the country's ultimate authority) including one by Román Delgado Chalbaud and another by Rafael Simón Urbina, both in 1929.

See also
Presidents of Venezuela

References 
  Juan Bautista Pérez – Official biography.
  Juan Bautista Pérez

Presidents of Venezuela
Politicians from Caracas
19th-century Venezuelan lawyers
Central University of Venezuela alumni
1869 births
1952 deaths
Venezuelan people of Spanish descent
Ambassadors of Venezuela to Spain